Duross Fitzpatrick (October 19, 1934 – January 6, 2008) was a United States district judge of the United States District Court for the Middle District of Georgia.

Education and career

Born in Macon, Georgia, Fitzpatrick was in the United States Marine Corps from 1954 to 1957, and thereafter received a Bachelor of Science in Finance from the University of Georgia in 1961 and a Bachelor of Laws from the University of Georgia School of Law in 1966. He was in private practice in Macon from 1966 to 1967, and then in Cochran, Georgia until 1986.

Federal judicial service

On November 14, 1985, Fitzpatrick was nominated by President Ronald Reagan to a new seat on the United States District Court for the Middle District of Georgia, created by 98 Stat. 333. He was confirmed by the United States Senate on December 16, 1985, and received his commission on December 17, 1985. He served as Chief Judge from 1995 to 2001, assuming senior status on February 1, 2001, and serving in that capacity until his death, in Jeffersonville, Georgia.

References

Sources
 

1934 births
2008 deaths
Georgia (U.S. state) lawyers
Judges of the United States District Court for the Middle District of Georgia
United States district court judges appointed by Ronald Reagan
20th-century American judges
United States Marines
People from Macon, Georgia
People from Jeffersonville, Georgia